Samuel Lee Selden (October 12, 1800 – September 20, 1876) was an American lawyer and politician from New York. He was Chief Judge of the New York Court of Appeals in 1862.

Life
Selden was born in Lyme, Connecticut in 1800 and moved to Rochester, New York in 1821 following his sister who had married Rochester lawyer Joseph Spencer. Selden studied law with Addison Gardiner, and formed a partnership with him after being admitted to the bar in 1825. On July 27, 1831, Selden married Susan Matilda Ward.

From 1831 to 1837, he was First Judge of the Monroe County Court.
 
From 1847 to 1855, he was a justice of the New York Supreme Court.

He was a judge of the New York Court of Appeals from 1856 to 1862, elected on the Hard Democratic ticket. He was Chief Judge from January to July 1862 when he resigned from the bench, and his brother Henry R. Selden was appointed to fill the vacancy.  He died in 1876 in Rochester, New York.

References

Sources
Political Graveyard
The New York Civil List compiled by Franklin Benjamin Hough (pages 348, 352 and 362; Weed, Parsons and Co., 1858)
History of the Pioneer Settlement of Phelps and Gorham's Purchase, and Morris' Reserve: Embracing the Counties of Monroe, Ontario, Livingston, Yates, Steuben, Most of Wayne and Allegany, and Parts of Orleans, Genesee, and Wyoming by Orsamus Turner (William Alling, 1851; page 613)

1800 births
1876 deaths
People from Lyme, Connecticut
Chief Judges of the New York Court of Appeals
Politicians from Rochester, New York
New York Supreme Court Justices
New York (state) Democrats
Lawyers from Rochester, New York
19th-century American judges
19th-century American lawyers
Rochester City School District superintendents